Miller Building is a historic commercial building located at Liberty, Clay County, Missouri. It was built in 1868, and is a two-story, rectangular brick building with Late Victorian style design elements.  It has a flat roof and features a decorative brick cornice, hooded window surrounds, and an intact storefront with cast-iron columns.

It was listed on the National Register of Historic Places in 1992.

References

Commercial buildings on the National Register of Historic Places in Missouri
Victorian architecture in Missouri
Commercial buildings completed in 1868
Buildings and structures in Clay County, Missouri
National Register of Historic Places in Clay County, Missouri
Liberty, Missouri